Honanodon is an extinct genus of hapalodectid mesonychian found Middle to Late Eocene strata of China and Pakistan.

Species
Genus Honanodon
Honanodon hebetis
Honanodon lushiensis
Honanodon macrodontus

External links
Global Data
Arctos database

Mesonychids
Eocene genus extinctions
Eocene mammals of Asia
Prehistoric placental genera